Hossein Rezazadeh (born 12 May 1978) is an Iranian politician and retired weightlifter. Rezazadeh is a two-time Olympic champion, four-time World Weightlifting champion, and five-time Asian champion. Rezazadeh has won the Iran Sportsperson of the Year award four times, more than any other athlete in the country's history. Rezazadeh is widely considered one of the greatest weightlifters of all time.

Weightlifting career
Before the International Weightlifting Federation reorganized the categories in 2018, he held the world record in weightlifting's super heavyweight class in the clean and jerk.  He is also one of Iran's most noted celebrities, frequently appearing on television and in the news; his wedding, which was held in the holy city of Mecca, in February 2003 was broadcast live on state television in Iran.

In 2002 he was voted the "Champion of Champions" of Iran and was one of 16 Iranian athletes granted a badge of courage from Iranian President Mohammad Khatami. As a reward for setting a world record in the clean and jerk at the 2002 World Weightlifting Championships in Warszawa, Poland, Mohammad Khatami awarded him 600 million rials (a little more than US$60,000 at the time) to buy a house in Tehran. After his spectacular performance, he was offered by Turkey’s Weightlifting Federation a stipend of US$20,000 a month, as well as a luxury villa and US$10 million reward if he switched nationalities and won gold for Turkey at the 2004 Athens Olympics, but he turned down their offer. Rezazadeh rejected the tempting offer saying, "I am an Iranian and love my country and people."

Rezazadeh surprised many at the 2000 Summer Olympics, earning a gold medal and breaking the decades-old monopoly on the gold by the Soviet Union and then Russia. His gold medal was the first since 1960 by a non-Soviet or non-Russian athlete in the over 105 kg class at a non boycotted Games. He broke his records in the clean and jerk at the 2004 Summer Olympics again leading up to 263.5 kg (580.9 pounds). His total (both lifts combined) at the 2004 Summer Olympics of 472.5 kg was 17.5 kg more than silver medalist Viktors Ščerbatihs. He has been named IWF World Weightlifter of the Year, and was shortlisted for weightlifter of the century.

Rezazadeh was also referred to by weightlifting commentators as "the strongest man in the world", primarily due to his world records in the olympics.

In 2006 the Rezazadeh Stadium was built in Rezazadeh's hometown of Ardabil. It was built to honour the achievements of Rezazadeh and is one of the most modern and innovative indoor arenas in Iran today.

In early 2008 Rezazadeh participated in a television commercial promoting a real estate agency based in Dubai. His participation surprised many of his fans and was seen as demeaning to both himself and his country, given the promotion of buying estates in a land deemed as a rival. This eventually led to the decision of the Iranian Majles to ban any sort of sponsorship from any high-profile Iranian - i.e. athlete, actor, singer - for any sort of product or service, due to the direct encouragement of product consumerism.

In 2008, Rezazadeh was advised by Dr. Mohammad Ali Shahi, his physician and medical athletic trainer, not to participate in the 2008 Olympics due to his severe hand injuries and his high blood pressure. To his fans' surprise and disappointment he officially announced in a letter read via National Iranian Television that he had accepted the advice. The next day Rezazdeh wrote another public letter announcing his retirement from professional weightlifting. He said "I am pretty sure that my fellow country men will repeat my accomplishments again and I hope my son Abulfazl will break my own records in future".

Immediately following his retirement Rezazdeh was appointed as the Prime Counselor for Iranian national weight lifting federation.

In September 2008, Rezazadeh was named manager and head coach of Iran's national weightlifting team. In January 2009, he was blamed for positive results of the steroid tests of four Iranian weightlifters. Later on, one of the team members, Saeid Alihosseini accused him of using steroids in 2006. Rezazadeh has publicly vowed to fight doping in weightlifting.

Political career 
Rezazadeh was elected as a member of City Council of Tehran in 2013 local elections.

Major result

World records

Notes and references 
  Before May 1, 2005, the totals in weightlifting were calculated by adding the result from the snatch and clean & jerk to the nearest 2.5 kg. This is why his 2004 Olympic performance adds up as 472.5 kg. 473.5 is not divisible by 2.5, thus it is rounded down to 472.5.

External links

 
 
 
 

1978 births
Living people
Iranian strength athletes
Iranian male weightlifters
World Weightlifting Championships medalists
Olympic gold medalists for Iran
Olympic weightlifters of Iran
People from Ardabil
Weightlifters at the 2000 Summer Olympics
Weightlifters at the 2004 Summer Olympics
World record holders in Olympic weightlifting
Asian Games gold medalists for Iran
Asian Games bronze medalists for Iran
Olympic medalists in weightlifting
Asian Games medalists in weightlifting
Weightlifters at the 1998 Asian Games
Weightlifters at the 2002 Asian Games
Weightlifters at the 2006 Asian Games
Medalists at the 2004 Summer Olympics
Front of Islamic Revolution Stability politicians
Tehran Councillors 2013–2017
Iranian sportsperson-politicians
Medalists at the 2000 Summer Olympics
Medalists at the 1998 Asian Games
Medalists at the 2002 Asian Games
Medalists at the 2006 Asian Games
Recipients of the Order of Courage (Iran)